Mani Osai is a 1963 Indian Tamil-language drama film, directed by P. Madhavan, his directorial debut. The film was produced by A. L. Srinivasan under ALS Productions and written by Pasumani. The film, inspired by Victor Hugo's French novel, The Hunchback of Notre-Dame, stars Kalyan Kumar, M. R. Radha, R. Muthuraman, C. R. Vijayakumari, V. Nagayya, Nagesh, Pushpalatha and Kumari Rukmani. Viswanathan–Ramamoorthy composed the music for the film.

Plot 
An egotistical rich man (M. R. Radha) abandons his elder son (Kalyan Kumar) because of his physical imperfections. He tells his wife (Kumari Rukmini) that the baby was born dead. The man has another son (R. Muthuraman) who leads a lazy life, often getting into trouble. He falls in love with his cousin (C. R. Vijayakumari), who is very close to the hunchback, treating him like a brother. The hunchback becomes a hero who sacrifices everything, taking the blame for others' wrongdoing. He finally restores sight to the hero and dies. Only after the hunchback's death does the father tell the world that he was his firstborn.

Cast 
 Kalyan Kumar
 M. R. Radha
 R. Muthuraman
 C. R. Vijayakumari
 Pushpalatha
 Kumari Rukmani
 V. Nagayya
 M. S. S. Bhagyam
 Nagesh
 Pushpamala
 "Baby" Chandrakala

Production 
Mani Osai is the directorial debut of P. Madhavan, and was inspired by French writer Victor Hugo's 1831 novel, The Hunchback of Notre-Dame. It was produced by A. L. Srinivasan under his company A. L. Productions.

Reception 

The film received critical acclaim, but did not perform well at the box office; according to film historian Randor Guy, this was due to its lack of a handsome hero.

Soundtrack 
The music was composed by Viswanathan–Ramamoorthy, with lyrics by Kannadasan. Some of the film's songs, such as "Payuthu Paayuthu", "Devan Kovil Mani Osai" and "Aattukkutti Aattukkutti Mammavai" became popular.

References

External links 
 

1960s Tamil-language films
1963 directorial debut films
1963 films
Films based on French novels
Films directed by P. Madhavan
Films scored by Viswanathan–Ramamoorthy
Indian black-and-white films
Indian drama films
1963 drama films